Fascene Airport  is an international airport located on the island of Nosy Be, just off the northwest coast of Madagascar, in the Diana region. Since Nosy Be is one of the most developed tourism destinations in Madagascar, the airport is one of the busiest in the country.

Airlines and destinations

Homepage
https://ravinala-airports.aero/nosy-be/

References

External links
 
 

Airports in Madagascar
Diana Region